5 Ursae Minoris is a star in the circumpolar constellation of Ursa Minor. It is a faint star but visible to the naked eye with an apparent visual magnitude of 4.253. It is moving further away with a heliocentric radial velocity of +9 km/s.

With an age of around two billion years, this is an evolved red giant with a stellar classification of K4-III; a star that has used up its core hydrogen and has expanded. It is a mild barium star, which may indicate it is a binary with a white dwarf companion, and is very lithium-weak. The star has an estimated 1.86 times the mass of the Sun and has expanded to about 16 times the Sun's radius. It is radiating 447 times the Sun's luminosity from its enlarged photosphere at an effective temperature of 4,095 K.

References

K-type giants
Suspected variables
Ursa Minor (constellation)
Durchmusterung objects
Ursae Minoris, 05
127700
070692
5430